In linear algebra, a column vector with  elements is an  matrix consisting of a single column of  entries, for example,

(Throughout this article, boldface is used for both row and column vectors.)
 
The transpose (indicated by ) of any row vector is a column vector, and the transpose of any column vector is a row vector:

and

The set of all row vectors with  entries in a given field (such as the real numbers) forms an -dimensional vector space; similarly, the set of all column vectors with  entries forms an -dimensional vector space.

The space of row vectors with  entries can be regarded as the dual space of the space of column vectors with  entries, since any linear functional on the space of column vectors can be represented as the left-multiplication of a unique row vector.

Notation 

To simplify writing column vectors in-line with other text, sometimes they are written as row vectors with the transpose operation applied to them.

or

Some authors also use the convention of writing both column vectors and row vectors as rows, but separating row vector elements with commas and column vector elements with semicolons (see alternative notation 2 in the table below).

Operations 

Matrix multiplication involves the action of multiplying each row vector of one matrix by each column vector of another matrix. 

The matrix product of a column and a row vector gives the outer product of two vectors , an example of the more general tensor product.

Matrix transformations

An  matrix  can represent a linear map and act on row and column vectors as the linear map's transformation matrix. For a row vector , the product  is another row vector : 

Continuing with row vectors, matrix transformations further reconfiguring -space can be applied to the right of previous outputs.

When a column vector is transformed to another column vector under an  matrix action, the operation occurs to the left,

leading to the algebraic expression   for the composed output from  input. The matrix transformations mount up to the left in this use of a column vector for input to matrix transformation.

See also 
 Covariance and contravariance of vectors
 Index notation
 Vector of ones
 Single-entry vector
 Standard unit vector
 Unit vector

Notes

References 

 
 
 
 
 
 

Linear algebra
Matrices
Vectors (mathematics and physics)